PSG Institute of Management Coimbatore (PSGIM) is a private business school located in Coimbatore, Tamil Nadu, India. Founded in 1994. It has four streams of studies that include Finance, Marketing, Operations, HR. Dual degree and Business Analytics is also available. It is a part of PSG College of Technology.

PSGIM offers a variety of programs in management, including a two-year full-time MBA program, a two-year full-time PGDM program, and a Ph.D. program in management. The MBA program has several specializations including Marketing, Finance, HR, Operations, Systems, and Entrepreneurship.

The institution has several research centers, including the Center for Entrepreneurship Development, the Center for Behavioral Science, the Center for Family Business, and the Center for Business Analytics. These centers provide students and faculty with the opportunity to conduct research in their respective fields.

References

External links 
Official website

Business schools in Tamil Nadu
Universities and colleges in Coimbatore
1994 establishments in Tamil Nadu
Educational institutions established in 1994